Claire Berger is a French physicist at the Georgia Institute of Technology and a Director of Research at the French National Centre for Scientific Research. Berger has co-authored about 200 publications in international journals and has a citation index of 10,880. She was recently elected fellow of the American Physical Society.

Berger took as the subject of her PhD the electronic properties of AIMn quasicrystals. She gained her doctorate at the University of Grenoble, France, making hers the first thesis in France on quasicrystals (crystals declared non-existent by orthodoxies of 20th century science.) Having studied and produced amorphous films in a postdoctoral position at the Centre D'Etudes Atomiques, she was hired as a researcher at the CNRS's Laboratory for Study of Electronic Properties of Solids (LEPES), where she contributed to the experimental evidence for a metal-insulator transition in the compound quasicrystalline materials grown and characterised at LEPES.

She is notable for her co-authorship of the first article demonstrating the two dimensional properties of graphene and for proposing the use of graphene in electronics. Together with Walt de Heer and Phil First she co-authored the first patent for graphene electronics in 2003.

Her current scientific interests are primarily in the field of nano science and the electronic properties of graphene-based systems.

References

Year of birth missing (living people)
Living people
French physicists
Grenoble Alpes University alumni
Georgia Tech faculty
Fellows of the American Physical Society